Olaf Carlson-Wee (born 1989) is an American entrepreneur and the CEO of cryptocurrency fund Polychain Capital, which he founded in 2016. He was the first employee of Coinbase. Carlson-Wee was named in the Forbes 30 Under 30 list in 2018.

Career 
After graduating from Vassar College in 2012, he joined the cryptocurrency exchange Coinbase in 2013 as the first employee of the company. He was paid in bitcoins for three years.

He left Coinbase and founded Polychain Capital, a cryptocurrency investment firm, in 2016. The firm secured investments from venture capital firms Sequoia Capital, Union Square Ventures and Founders Fund. Polychain claimed $1 billion in assets in 2017 but the total dropped to $592 million at the end of 2018 as the value of its holdings fell. The firm managed assets worth $4 billion in April 2021.

In July 2017, Carlson-Wee appeared on the cover of Forbes with the cover line, "Craziest Bubble Ever". In 2018, he was named in the Forbes 30 Under 30 list. He featured in Fortune magazine's 40 Under 40 in 2018.

Carlson-Wee was again profiled as part of Forbes’s Blockchain 50 2022 and in a related Forbes video feature.

References 

Living people
1989 births
People from Minnesota
Businesspeople from Minnesota
Vassar College alumni